RubberBand is a Cantopop band formed in Hong Kong in 2004. They signed with Gold Typhoon label in 2006. They started as a 5-man band but after keyboard player Ngai Sum's departure in October 2010, comprise 4 members.

History
In 2006, the band took its music tapes to record companies. Mark Lui took notice of their music and signed them to Gold Typhoon.

In January 2022, local media reported that ten Canto-pop singers and groups had been put on a blacklist of government-funded broadcaster RTHK, with radio DJs having been ordered not to play their songs. RubberBand was reportedly on the list.

Discography
To date the band has released 12 albums:
Apollo 18 (2008)
Beaming (2009)
RubberBand Concert #1 (2010)
Connected (2010)
Dedicated To... (2011)
Easy (2012)
Frank (2014)
¿Frank? EP. (2014)
We Are RubberBand (2015)
Gotta Go (2016)
Hours (2018)
i (2020)

References

Cantonese-language singers
Cantopop musical groups